This list details display typefaces used in typesetting and printing.

See also
List of monospaced typefaces
List of sans serif typefaces
List of script typefaces
List of serif typefaces

References

 
Display
Display